This article is a list of diseases of pistachios (Pistacia vera).

Fungal diseases

Diseases of uncertain cause

Miscellaneous diseases and disorders

References

Common Names of Diseases, The American Phytopathological Society

Pistachio
Tree diseases
Pistacia